is a multi-purpose dam on the Aseishi River, a tributary of the Iwaki River in the city of Kuroishi in Aomori Prefecture, Japan. Construction began on the dam in 1971, and it was completed in 1988.

References

Dams in Aomori Prefecture
Dams completed in 1988
Kuroishi, Aomori
Gravity dams